HM 1, also known as Havlen-Moffat 1, is an open cluster located in the constellation of Scorpius, close to the galactic plane. It was first observed by R. J. Havlen and A. F. J. Moffat in 1976. HM 1 is thought to be 9,500 to 12,700 light-years (2,900 to 3,900 parsecs) away from the Earth, beyond the Carina–Sagittarius Arm. It is heavily reddened by interstellar extinction, so although it comprises mostly blue-colored stars, it appears brighter for longer-wavelength passbands. It is projected against the H II region known as RCW 121, and appears to be the source of ionization for the nearby regions RCW 122 and RCW 123.

Properties
The extinction value for HM 1 is calculated to be EB−V = 1.85 magnitudes, and its distance was first estimated to be around 2.9 ± 0.4 kiloparsecs away. Later estimates put the cluster at around 3.3 kiloparsecs away; this is still one of the more closer massive star clusters.

HM 1 is fairly young for an open cluster; it is estimated to be 1 to 2, or 2 to 4 million years old. This is indicated by the presence of Of stars, which have relatively short lives. However, subsequent work showed the star is likely in the foreground.

Composition
HM 1 is noted for its components, including several Wolf–Rayet stars and Of stars. Both types of stars are fairly rare and very massive, and their coexistence in star clusters was unexpected. The evolution of Wolf–Rayet stars and Of stars in star clusters is currently unclear. Very few Wolf–Rayet stars have been found in star clusters, and a possible explanation is that the formation of these cluster Wolf–Rayet stars requires a binary star system containing two Of stars. Alternatively, cluster Wolf–Rayet stars may simply be rare because they represent a short stage in the evolution of Of stars, whether single or binary.

Many of the stellar components are extremely blue-colored O-type stars that are among some of the most luminous stars known. Examples include the peculiar star LSS 4067, an O-type supergiant with a spectral type of O4If+. WR 89, another luminous star, is a strong X-ray source and is possibly a colliding-wind binary, based on data from XMM-Newton. In contrast, WR 87 has a high plasma temperature consistent with that of a colliding-wind binary but otherwise appears to be a single star (similar to WR 136).

See also
Cygnus OB2, an OB association containing many massive stars

References

Notes

Scorpius
Open clusters